Latowicz  is a town in Mińsk County, Masovian Voivodeship, in east-central Poland. It is the seat of the gmina (administrative district) called Gmina Latowicz.

The town has a population of 1,429.

Notable people
 Maria Michał Kowalski (1871–1942), Polish religious leader, founder of the Catholic Mariavite Church

References

Cities and towns in Masovian Voivodeship
Mińsk County
Masovian Voivodeship (1526–1795)
Warsaw Governorate
Warsaw Voivodeship (1919–1939)